Muhammad Alif bin Zakaria (born 24 June 1998) is a Malaysian professional footballer who plays as a defender for Malaysia Super League club Terengganu.

Born in Kampung Paya Datu, Manir, Kuala Terengganu, Alif went to Sekolah Menengah Kebangsaan Jeram.

Personal life
On April 1, 2022, he officially married with Fifyana.

References

External links
 

1998 births
Living people
People from Terengganu
Malaysian footballers
Terengganu F.C. II players
Terengganu FC players
Malaysia Premier League players
Malaysia Super League players
Malaysian people of Malay descent
Association football defenders